Epicephala mirivalvata is a moth   of the family Gracillariidae. It is found in Fujian and Hainan, China.

The larvae feed on Breynia fruticosa and Breynia rostrata.

References

Epicephala
Moths described in 2012